Alessandra Karpoff (born 3 June 1963) is an Italian voice actress, who voices characters in anime, cartoons, movies, and other content. She was born in Milan.

She provides the voice of Misty in the Italian-language version of the anime series Pokémon. Karpoff also voiced Keiko Yukimura in the Italian-language version of the anime series YuYu Hakusho.

She was also the voice of Sailor Mars (1st season), Sailor Neptune and Sailor Jupiter (last season) in the Italian version of Sailor Moon.

She works at Merak Film, Deneb Film, Studio P.V., and other dubbing studios in Milan, Italy.

Voice work

Anime and animation
 Misty, Lilly Meridian, Cynthia, and Hunter J in Pokémon
 Misty in Pokémon Chronicles
 Misty in Pokémon: The First Movie
 Misty in Pokémon: The Movie 2000
 Misty in Pokémon 3: The Movie
 Misty in Pokémon 4Ever
 Misty in Pokémon Heroes
 Sabrina Spellman on Sabrina: The Animated Series
 Nefertari Vivi (Episode 291-present) in One Piece
 Natsumi Hinata in Sgt. Frog
 Rosé in Fullmetal Alchemist
 Lucy van Pelt in It Was My Best Birthday Ever, Charlie Brown
 Miho Shinohara/Fancy Lala in Fancy Lala
 Reina in Angel's Friends
 Princess Peach in The Super Mario Bros. Super Show!
 Emi Isuzu in Tenjho Tenge
 Delphinium in Blue Dragon
 Delphinium in Blue Dragon: Trial of the Seven Shadows
 Bobbi "Blade" Summer in Batman Beyond
 Mamu in Oobi
 Jenny Wakeman in My Life as a Teenage Robot
 Tad in LeapFrog
 Shingo Tsukino in Sailor Moon (Viz Media redub)
 Penelope Asparagus in VeggieTales
 Space Boy and Young Gizmo in Rolie Polie Olie
 Joyce Griff in Stanley
 Zoe in Harvey Girls Forever!
 Samantha Jones in Sarah Lee Jones
 Tito Chavez, Rebecca, Chrissy's Mom and Jimmy McCorkle in Maya & Miguel
 Princess Frostine in Candy Land: The Great Lollipop Adventure
 Lois in Bear in the Big Blue House
 Click in Between the Lions
 Vega in My Life as an Adult Android
 Sam in Totally Spies!
 Tracy in Tomodachi Life: The TV Series
 Aelita Schaeffer(2nd voice) in Code Lyoko
 Deborah "Debbie" Thornberry in The Wild Thornberrys
 Grace Jones in Emma - A Victorian Romance
 Pail in Blue's Clues
 Satsuki Arashiyama in Nanaka 6/17
 Keiko Yukimura in YuYu Hakusho
 Biscuit Krueger in Hunter x Hunter
 Sherry Belmont in Zatch Bell!
 Tracy Milbanks in James Bond Jr.
 Yuzuriha Nekoi in X
 Winnie in Alfred J. Kwak
 Lady Bat in Mermaid Melody Pichi Pichi Pitch Pure
 and others

Live action
 Victoria in How I Met Your Mother
 Jenny in The Muppets Take Manhattan
 Kim in Barney & Friends
 Elaine Vassal in Ally McBeal
 Agnes Carlsson in Survivors
 Beth in Vincent
 Miranda in Blue's Clues
 Ashley Elliot in USA High
 Dr. Gina Jefferson in Sesame Street
 Diane Hughes in Jake 2.0
 Fran in Catastrophe
 Lauren Zelmer in Just for Kicks (TV series)
 Alyson Butler in Call Red
 Klaudia in Frontier(s)
 Audrey Malone in Beggars and Choosers
 Anne-Marie Uhde in Séraphine
 and others

References

External links
 

Living people
Actresses from Milan
Italian voice actresses
1963 births